The Partition Museum is a public museum located in the town hall of Amritsar, Punjab, India. The museum aims to become the central repository of stories, materials, and documents related to the post-partition riots that followed the division of British India into two independent dominions: India and Pakistan. The museum was inaugurated on 25 August 2017.

History

In 1947, British India was divided into India and Pakistan. The partition lines, drawn on a map by the British lawyer Cyril Radcliffe, divided the province of Punjab into West Punjab and East Punjab on the basis of religion. As a result, millions of people found themselves on the wrong side of the border overnight. According to various estimates, more than 800,000 Muslims, Hindus, and Sikhs were killed in the riots that followed the partition between August 1947 to January 1948. Additionally, more than 1,400,000 people became refugees.

The Government of Punjab founded this museum with The Arts and Cultural Heritage Trust of the United Kingdom as a way to memorialize those who were affected by the partition.

References 

Museums in Punjab, India
Tourist attractions in Amritsar
History museums in India